The Ainu and Native American power boards are two hand carved wooden planks by members of Ainu and Chinook tribes, installed outside the Oregon Convention Center in Portland, Oregon. The pieces were commissioned for Forest of Dreams and exhibited at the Portland Japanese Garden before being erected in the Lloyd Center in 2019.

References

Ainu
Indigenous art
Japanese-American culture in Portland, Oregon
Lloyd District, Portland, Oregon
Native American history of Oregon
Northeast Portland, Oregon
Outdoor sculptures in Portland, Oregon
Wooden sculptures in Oregon